Chen Xu is the personal name of Emperor Xuan of Chen

Other people with this name:

 Chen Xu (diplomat), Chinese diplomat, former Chinese Ambassador to the Netherlands.
 Chen Xu (geologist), Chinese geologist, member of the Chinese Academy of Sciences.
 Chen Xu (prosecutor) (born 1952), former Chinese prosecutor who served as the Prosecutor General of Shanghai People's Procuratorate from 2008 to 2016. 
 Chen Xu (politician) (born 1963), Chinese politician, deputy head of the United Front Work Department, former communist party secretary of Tsinghua University.
 Chen Xu (footballer) (born 1985), Chinese retired association footballer

See also
 Xu Chen (disambiguation)